The 2020 Eastern Illinois Panthers football team represented Eastern Illinois University as a member of the Ohio Valley Conference (OVC) during the 2020–21 NCAA Division I FCS football season. Led by second-year head coach Adam Cushing, the Panthers compiled an overall record of 1–5 overall with an identical mark in conference play, placing last out of eight teams in the OVC. Eastern Illinois played home games at O'Brien Field in Charleston, Illinois.

Previous season

The Panthers finished the 2019 season 1–11, 1–7 in OVC play to finish in last place.

Schedule
Eastern Illinois had a game against Kentucky, which was canceled due to the COVID-19 pandemic.

References

Eastern Illinois
Eastern Illinois Panthers football seasons
Eastern Illinois Panthers football